The Baltimore River is a  river in Michigan. It originates in Ontonagon County and flows into the Middle Branch of the Ontonagon River and thence into Lake Superior. The O Kun de Kun Falls are located on the river.

See also
List of rivers of Michigan

References

Rivers of Michigan
Rivers of Ontonagon County, Michigan
Tributaries of Lake Superior